Oluwatofarati "Tofa" Fakunle (born 1 November 1995) is a former Canadian professional soccer player. Currently, Fakunle is the Assistant General Manager for Canadian Premier League club Cavalry FC.

Club career

Calgary Foothills
Fakunle played for the Calgary Foothills from 2015 until 2019. In 2016 he made eleven league appearances, scoring one goal, and made another five playoff appearances, where he added another goal. The following year, he made twelve appearances for Foothills.

In 2018, Fakunle made thirteen league appearances, scoring one goal, and made a further three appearances in the playoffs as Calgary went on to win the PDL Championship. In 2019, he made thirteen league appearances, scoring six goals, and scored another in one playoff appearance.

Cavalry FC
After training with the club in preseason that year, Fakunle signed his first professional contract with Canadian Premier League side Cavalry FC on 28 August 2019. He made his debut that day as a substitute in a 1–1 draw against Pacific FC. Fakunle would not be listed on Cavalry's training camp roster for the 2020 season, ending his time with the club after one season. He remained with the club in 2020 as part of the coaching staff, but during an injury crisis was added to the roster for a match against HFX Wanderers, appearing as a late-game substitute.

Management career
Upon completion of his playing career, Fakunle would serve as the Operations Manager for Cavalry FC, and would later be promoted to Assistant General Manager prior to the 2022 season.

Honours

Club 
Calvary FC 
 Canadian Premier League Finals 
Runners-up: 2019
Canadian Premier League (Regular season): 
Champions: Spring 2019, Fall 2019

References

External links

1995 births
Living people
Association football forwards
Nigerian emigrants to Canada
Canadian soccer players
Calgary Foothills FC players
Cavalry FC players
USL League Two players
Canadian Premier League players
Sportspeople from Lagos